Rainbow Fish is a 2000 British animated children's television series adapted from the book of the same name by Marcus Pfister. Unlike the book, the television adaptation didn't follow the plot; instead, it takes the character and the setting and creates a new story with them, with some characters being added and others embellishing for the purposes of the series, in which the place where the fish live is called "Neptune Bay" (after Neptune, the god of the sea), with the fish mostly attending "The School of Fish". It also features a shipwreck called "Shipwreck Park" (which resembles the wreck of the RMS Titanic). The series was produced by Decode Entertainment and EM.TV in association with Sony Wonder.

The series originally aired from 8 January until 24 December 2000 on Tiny Pop in the UK and on HBO Family in the US. , a range of VHS and DVD releases of Rainbow Fish remain available in the UK. 52 episodes were produced.

Characters
Rainbow Fish (also known as "Rainbow") is a 9-year-old proud, vibrant male fish with glimmering scales who is the title character. He lives with his parents (Sol and Aqua) and 12-year-old sister ("Ruby") in a cave near Shipwreck Park. Voiced by Rhys Huber.

Sea Filly the Seahorse is a 9-year-old girl in the school of fish. She is a beautiful mermaid-seahorse hybrid, whom is often seen reading books. She eventually becomes firm friends with Rainbow Fish and Blue. She is friendly and has orange hair. Voiced by Chantal Strand.

Blue is Rainbow Fish's best friend, who is more down-to-Earth and thoughtful than Rainbow Fish. He is a 9-year-old bluefish and has a baby sister named Turquoise. Blue is based on the small blue fish from the Rainbow Fish book series by Marcus Pfister. Voiced by Andrew Francis.

Ruby is Rainbow Fish's ruby-coloured and bossy 12-year-old sister. She is arrogant and self-centered. Although Ruby means well, she regularly gets Rainbow Fish into trouble, only because she occasionally gets jealous, although she actually loves him, just like Aqua and Sol. Voiced by Chiara Zanni.

Aqua is an aqua-coloured fish and is Rainbow’s mother, while Sol is purple and is Rainbow's father. They help their daughter and son whatever way they can and will always provide them with great courage. Sol was voiced by John Payne and Aqua was voiced by Ellen Kennedy.

Principal Gefilte is the proud Principal of the School of Fish who is strict about behavior. Voiced by the late French Tickner.

Mrs Chips is the only teacher of the school of fish who teaches art, history, mathematics, science, and literature. Voiced by Ellen Kennedy.

Wanda the Octopus is the owner of Neptune Bay's fast food restaurant who is very wise. When Rainbow Fish and his friends are feeling down, she will always give them some good advice. She is based on the Wise Octopus from the original book. Voiced by Kathleen Barr.

Chomper and Stingo are two bullies of the school of fish. While they do not really commit acts of physical violence, they can bully and tease Rainbow Fish and his friends. Chomper is a shark while Stingo is a stingray. Chomper was voiced by Christopher Gray and Stingo was voiced by Bill Switzer.

Sherman Shrimp is the smallest student of the school of fish; to him, everything looks big. Voiced by Alex Doduk.

Sir Sword is a local swordfish, upper-class and a bit of a busybody. He is sometimes grumpy, and sometimes civil, but always seems to think he is better than everyone else. Voiced by Colin Murdock.

Episodes

Broadcast 
The broadcasters are Rai 3 in Italy, TVE2 and Cartoon Network in Spain, ARD in Germany,  MTV3 in Finland, HBO Family in the United States, and Tiny Pop in the United Kingdom.

References

External links
 

2000s American animated television series
2000 American television series debuts
2000 American television series endings
2000s Canadian animated television series
2000 Canadian television series debuts
2000 Canadian television series endings
2000 German television series debuts
2000 German television series endings
American television shows based on children's books
American children's animated fantasy television series
Canadian television shows based on children's books
Canadian children's animated fantasy television series
German children's animated fantasy television series
HBO original programming
Teletoon original programming
English-language television shows
Television series by DHX Media
Television series by Sony Pictures Television
Animated television series about children
Animated television series about fish